1964: Eyes of the Storm is a forthcoming book of photographs taken by the English musician Paul McCartney. McCartney discovered the photographs in 2020 and approached the National Portrait Gallery in London about hosting an exhibition.

References 

Paul McCartney
British non-fiction books
Books of photographs
2023 non-fiction books
Books about the Beatles
Allen Lane (imprint) books